is a passenger railway station located in Asahi-ku, Yokohama, Japan, operated by the private railway operator Sagami Railway (Sotetsu).

Lines 
Tsurugamine Station is served by the Sagami Railway Main Line, and lies 8.5 kilometers from the starting point of the line at Yokohama Station.

Station layout
The station consists of two opposed side platforms serving two tracks.

Platforms

Adjacent stations

History 
Tsurugamine Station was opened on 25 October 1930.

Future plans 
The station facilities are planned to be transitioned to an elevated structure by 2034. The results of the planning process were presented in January 2022, and it was determined that the project will cost . Construction for the elevation of the  section of the Sotetsu Main Line began in June 2022. 

The goal of the project is to remove 10 level crossings from the main line.

Gallery

Passenger statistics
In fiscal 2019, the station was used by an average of 57,068 passengers daily.

The passenger figures for previous years are as shown below.

Surrounding area
Asahi Ward Office
 Yokohama City Asahi Library
 Yokohama City Waterworks Bureau Asahi / Seya Service Center
 Asahi Civil Engineering Office
 Resource Recycling Bureau Asahi Office

See also
 List of railway stations in Japan

References

External links 

 Official home page  

Railway stations in Kanagawa Prefecture
Railway stations in Japan opened in 1930
Railway stations in Yokohama